The 1981 Algerian Cup Final was the 19th final of the Algerian Cup. The final took place on June 19, 1981, at Stade 24 Fevrier 1956 in Sidi Bel Abbes. USK Alger beat ASC Oran 2-1 to win their first Algerian Cup.

Route to the final

Match

Pre-match

Summary

Match details

References

Cup
Algeria
Algerian Cup Finals
USM Alger matches